Puerto Escondido International Airport  is an airport located at Puerto Escondido in the state of Oaxaca in Mexico. It handles national and international air traffic for the city of Puerto Escondido on the Pacific coast. It is operated by Aeropuertos y Servicios Auxiliares, a federal government-owned corporation.

One of the fastest growing airports in the country due to Puerto Escondido's popularity as a tourist destination, it handled 526,423 passengers in 2021, and 729,004 passengers in 2022.

Facilities

Airlines and destinations

Passenger

Statistics

Passengers

Busiest routes

Gallery

See also 

List of the busiest airports in Mexico

References

External links
 Puerto Escondido Intl. Airport

Airports in Oaxaca